Diocese of Rio Grande may refer to:

Episcopal Diocese of the Rio Grande, located in New Mexico and Texas, United States
Roman Catholic Diocese of Rio Grande, located in Rio Grande, Brazil